Maryoku Yummy is an American children's animated television series that aired on The Hub from October 11 to November 15, 2010. It is based on the 2001 greeting card character, Maryoku Yummy. The show's intellectual property was created by Jeffrey Conrad of American Greetings. The show's production began in 2007 with a deal with DQ Entertainment.

Plot
Maryoku Yummy is set in a whimsical world known as Nozomu. It is populated by the Yummy, and small creatures called wishes, the latter from children which are sent here and become granted by Wish Sitters. A trio of Wish Sitters, Maryoku, Ooka and Fij Fij, assists their wishes to become true. So far the only wish not granted, but lives in Nozomu with the Yummy, is a yellow and blue wish by the name of Fudan, who can talk unlike the other wishes.

Characters

Main
Maryoku: The main protagonist. She is a scarlet-pink yummy with yellow spiral antennae and a yellow spiral tail. She makes sure all wishes are loved, encouraged, and cared for and is always there to help anyone, especially her friends.
Ooka: Maryoku's best friend. She is a blue-green with yummy green antennae. She would rather take the day off than work, which usually gets her into trouble. However, she does know how to have fun.
Fij Fij: Maryoku's other best friend. He is a yellow. yummy with a pink nose. He is extremely shy and very cautious. Luckily, Maryoku is there to bring him out of his shell. He also seems to have a crush on Maryoku.
Hadagi: The leader of another Wish-Sitting team. She is a purple yummy with yellow star antennae. Hadagi is sometimes bossy and jealous of Maryoku at times. She can also get very competitive. But, she can also be friendly at times.
Bob: The Yummies' wish deliverer, who is yellow and wears a wish hat. He can deliver wishes to Nozomu very fast. He also provides a sense of humor while on his job.
Shika: The Yummies' chief officer, who is blue with a green hat. He knows all about the rules, and often gets cranky when someone doesn't obey them.
Nonki: Nozomu's resident inventor; he is teal and wears a construction hat. He is really smart and can fix almost anything. He's the taller one who barely says a word. When he does, it's usually "yup" or "nope".
Yuzu: Nonki's best friend; he is a yellow  and white with yummy a green leaf antennae. He also likes to invent, but sometimes messes up. He's also the shorter one who usually speaks.

Supporting
Omoshi: Nozomu's resident chef; he is green with a chef's hat. He doesn't use recipes from a recipe book, rather making up some of his own.
Tapo Tapo: The Yummies' leader who is blue with a yellow spiral antennae. He's very wise and always helps out the Yummies when they're stuck.
Fudan: A yellow and blue ungranted wish who lives with Tapo Tapo. He's Maryoku's favorite wish.
Enro: The Yummies' fitness teacher and coach; She is orange and yellow and wears a whistle that makes various different sounds rather than a whistle sound when she blows it. She teaches the wishes to exercise and usually helps Maryoku when she can't get a wish to listen.
Zuno: The Yummies' wish doctor; she is red and wears a doctor's mirror. According to Maryoku, she can help anyone feel better whenever they are sick before you can say "Yurble Burble".
Mabui: Shika's assistant who is pink with a yellow eggshell antennae. Her singing makes Shika dance along.
Jeppy: Omoshi's assistant who is orange with a yellow striped tail. He talks with a French accent.
Oolong: Hadagi's assistant who is orange with a yellow star tail. He can't speak, but he can still communicate through body language and facial expressions. He's also the biggest and strongest yummy, but caring.
Baburu: A blue member of Hadagi's wish-sitting team. She lives in a bubble and has a good sense of humor. She's also sarcastic and often acts as a voice of reason for Hadagi when Maryoku isn't around.
Bishu: Tapo Tapo's flying assistant who is purple with pink antennae. She watches over the community and is always willing to know what's up to date.
Inu: Fij Fij's pet. A small, dog-like Yummy who is blue and white. He is very playful and friendly to everybody. He also likes to fetch Shika's hat.
Wishy Wish: A retired character from Maryoku Yummy. He is a purple wish with a little blue flower on his head. He knows all about celebrations such as holidays and parties.
Wishy Woo: Another retired character from Maryoku Yummy. She is a green wish with a filling of pastel pink on her whole body. Wishy Woo loves a good joke. For her there's nothing like a day filled with giggles.

Episodes

Music
The theme song and soundtrack to this show was recorded by British indie band Saint Etienne.

References

External links
 

2010 American television series debuts
2010 American television series endings
2010s American animated television series
American children's animated adventure television series
American children's animated fantasy television series
American flash animated television series
American preschool education television series
Animated preschool education television series
2010s preschool education television series
Discovery Family original programming
English-language television shows